Coverty is a rural locality in the South Burnett Region, Queensland, Australia.

References

External links

South Burnett Region
Localities in Queensland